

List

References

U